Antonio Javier Arias Alvarenga (born 7 September 1972) is a Paraguayan football referee. He refereed at the 2014 FIFA World Cup qualifiers and first leg of the 2015 Copa Libertadores Finals.

Notes

References

External links
 
 
 

1972 births
Living people
Paraguayan football referees